Oruk Anam is a Local Government Area located in the southwestern part of Akwa Ibom State, Nigeria. It may be ranked as the largest LGA in Akwa-ibom due to its land popularity. Its headquarters are located in the town of Ikot Ibritam. It is one of the eight Annang-speaking local government areas.

It consists of two major political units, namely, the Oruk zone, and the Anam zone. Oruk zone used to be a Local Government Area with headquarters at Urua Anwa. Oruk zone was known as Southern Annang County Council of the former Abak Division.

Anam zone used to be Anam Local Government Area with headquarters at Ikot Akpan Essien. Anam was called Anam or Annang County Council in the former Opobo Division.

In 1989, the two Local Government Areas were merged into one.

It shares the same boundary with Ikot-Abasi/Mkpat-Enin (Ibibio speakers) by the south/east and Ukanafun (Anaang speakers) by the west. Its population according to the 2006 census is 172,000. Its inhabitant are mostly farmers, craftmen and civil servants. The area is a major gateway to Port Harcourt and Aba as such there is much commercial activity along the major road points like Ekparakwa. The area hosts some government interest like the general hospital located in Ikot Okoro, police stations and schools such as the Akwa Ibom State University (AKSU),in Obio Akpa (Obio Akpa Campus).

Major towns
The major towns in Oruk Anam are:

Administrative Areas 
The nine clans in Oruk Anam:

See also 
Ekpo Annang

References

Local Government Areas in Akwa Ibom State
1989 establishments in Nigeria
Towns in Oruk Anam